Badan Chandra Barphukan was the Chief of Ahom forces in Lower Assam and betrayed the kingdom by inviting the Burmese to invade Assam. He was installed as the Prime minister by the Burmese and later assassinated by Rup Singh Subedar in 1818. He is generally held responsible for the beginning of foreign rule in Assam and North East India.

References

Military personnel from Assam